Imagbon is a town located in Ogun State, Nigeria. It is located to the western frontiers of Ijebu-Ode, on a river tributary to the Lagos Lagoon. Imagbon is the Home town to Nigerian BusinessMan Damilola Adedoyin Adebajo, he is also the creative director  of TOWNBOY LLC

Imagbon War
It is the site of the definitive Imagbon War, also referred to as the Anglo-ljebu War, that occurred in 1892 between Yoruba forces and the Imperial British military. The military were assisted by protectorate treaty imposed on Lagos that enabled them to raise funds and troops supported by imported guns. A war memorial exists that commemorates the Imagbon War.

References

Further reading
 The British-Ijebu war of 1892 (The battle of Imagbon). Daily Mail (Nigeria).

External links
 "The Sad Story Of The Imagbon Community". Sahara Reporters.

Geography of Nigeria